Stephen Newman Whiting (born September 14, 1967) is a United States Space Force lieutenant general who serves as the first commander of the Space Operations Command. He previously served as the deputy commander of the Air Force Space Command, which was later redesignated as the Space Force.

Whiting was commissioned into the United States Air Force in 1989 as a distinguished graduate of the United States Air Force Academy. A space operations officer, he has commanded the 13th Space Warning Squadron, the 614th Air and Space Operations Center and Joint Space Operations Center, the 21st Space Wing, and the Combined Force Space Component Command and Fourteenth Air Force. He has also served staff assignments at the United States Air Force headquarters, United States Space Command, United States Strategic Command, the Chief of Naval Operations’ Strategic Studies Group, the Office of the Deputy Secretary of Defense, and the Air Force Space Command.

Education

 1985 Ocean Springs High School, Ocean Springs, Mississippi
 1989 Distinguished Graduate, Bachelor of Science, Aeronautical Engineering, U.S. Air Force Academy, Colorado Springs, Colo.
 1990 Top Graduate and Distinguished Graduate, Undergraduate Space Training, Lowry Air Force Base, Colo.
 1993 Distinguished Graduate, Squadron Officer School, Maxwell AFB, Ala.
 1997 Master of Arts, Administrative Sciences (Organizational Management), The George Washington University, Washington, D.C.
 2001 Top Graduate (tied) and Distinguished Graduate, Master of Arts, Military Operational Arts and Sciences, Air Command and Staff College, Maxwell AFB, Ala.
 2002 Master of Arts, Airpower Strategy, School of Advanced Air and Space Studies, Maxwell AFB, Ala.
 2008 Joint Forces Staff College, Norfolk, Va.
 2017 Senior Executives in National and International Security, John F. Kennedy School of Government at Harvard University, Executive Education, Cambridge, Mass.

Assignments

1. July 1989 – November 1990, Student, 14th Student Squadron, Columbus Air Force Base, Miss.
2. November 1990 – November 1993, Crew Commander, Deputy Chief of Training, and Chief of Standardization and Evaluation, 6th Space Warning Squadron, Cape Cod Air Force Station, Mass.
3. November 1993 – December 1994, Radar Systems Officer, 21st Operations Support Squadron, Peterson AFB, Colo.
4. December 1994 – July 1995, Executive Officer, 21st Operations Group, Peterson AFB, Colo.
5. August 1995 – May 1997, Air Force Intern, Headquarters U.S. Air Force and The George Washington University, Washington, D.C.
6. August 1997 – June 1999, UHF F/O Satellite Vehicle Operator, Crew Commander, and Operations Flight Commander, 3rd Space Operations Squadron, Schriever AFB, Colo.
7. June 1999 – July 2000, Operations Officer, 22nd Space Operations Squadron, Schriever AFB, Colo.
8. August 2000 – June 2001, Student, Air Command and Staff College, Maxwell AFB, Ala.
9. July 2001 – June 2002, Student, School of Advanced Air and Space Studies, Maxwell AFB, Ala.
10. July 2002 – June 2003, Regional Policy Officer, Headquarters U.S. Space Command and U.S. Strategic Command West, Peterson AFB, Colo.
11. June 2003 – June 2004, Special Assistant to the Commander, Headquarters U.S Strategic Command, Offutt AFB, Neb.
12. July 2004 – July 2005, Commander, 13th Space Warning Squadron, Clear AFS, Alaska
13. July 2005 – May 2006, Air Force Fellow, RAND Corporation, Santa Monica, Calif.
14. June 2006 – June 2008, Commander, 614th Air and Space Operations Center and Director, Joint Space Operations Center, Vandenberg AFB, Calif.
15. September 2008 – August 2009, Chief of Staff U.S. Air Force Fellow, with duty at the Chief of Naval Operations' Strategic Studies Group, Newport, R.I.
16. August 2009 – June 2011, Commander, 21st Space Wing, Peterson AFB, Colo.
17. July 2011 – July 2013, Military Assistant and Acting Senior Military Assistant to the Deputy Secretary of Defense, the Pentagon, Arlington, Va.
18. July 2013 – July 2015, Vice Commander, U.S. Air Force Warfare Center, Nellis AFB, Nev.
19. July 2015 – October 2015, Space Enterprise Vision Team Lead, Headquarters Air Force Space Command, Peterson AFB, Colo.
20. November 2015 – August 2017, Director of Integrated Air, Space, Cyberspace and Intelligence, Surveillance and Reconnaissance Operations, Headquarters Air Force Space Command, Peterson AFB, Colo.
21. August 2017 – November 2017, Joint Force Space Component Command Integration Team Lead, Headquarters Air Force Space Command, Peterson AFB, Colo.
22. December 2017 – August 2019, Commander, Fourteenth Air Force, Air Force Space Command, and Deputy Joint Force Space Component Commander, U.S. Strategic Command, Vandenberg AFB, Calif.
23. August 2019 – November 2019, Combined Force Space Component Commander, U.S. Space Command, and Commander, 14th Air Force, Air Force Space Command, Vandenberg AFB, Calif.
24. November 2019 – December 2019, Deputy Commander, Air Force Space Command, Peterson AFB, Colo.
25. December 2019 – October 2020, Deputy Commander, Headquarters United States Space Force, Peterson AFB, Colo.
26. October 2020 – present, Commander, Space Operations Command, Peterson AFB, Colo.

Personal life 
Whiting is the son of Mr. and Mrs. Larry Whiting. His father is a retired Air Force lieutenant colonel. He married Tammy Lynn Preslar on June 1, 1989.

Awards and decorations 

Whiting is the recipient of the following awards:

Dates of promotion

Writings

Thesis

References

External links
 

Living people
Place of birth missing (living people)
United States Air Force Academy alumni
George Washington University alumni
Air Command and Staff College alumni
School of Advanced Air and Space Studies alumni
United States Air Force generals
United States Space Force generals
Lieutenant generals
Office of the Chief of Space Operations personnel
1967 births